William Emerson Sr. (31 May 1743, Malden, Province of Massachusetts Bay30 October 1776, West Rutland, New Hampshire (now Vermont)) was a  Congregational minister. He was the father of William Emerson Jr. and Mary Moody Emerson, and grandfather of Ralph Waldo Emerson.

Emerson Sr. served as chaplain of the Massachusetts Provincial Congress and chaplain of the Continental Army. He died in 1776.

Family tree

See also
 The Old Manse

External links 
 

Emerson, William Sr.
Clergy in the American Revolution
Continental Army officers from Massachusetts
Emerson, William Sr.
Year of birth unknown
American people of English descent
1743 births